Lindon Berisha (born 7 June 1990), also known mononymously as Lindon, is a Macedonian-Albanian pop singer.

Life and career

1990–2015 

Lindon Berisha was born on 7 June 1990 into an Albanian family in the city of Skopje, then part of the Socialist Republic of Macedonia, present North Macedonia. His father, Agron Berisha, was also a popular singer and songwriter during the late 20th century. Berisha made his breakthrough in the Albanian-speaking world in 2015 and 2016 as he was featured on the singles "Kalle", "Asnihere" and "Money" by Macedonian-Albanian singer Adrian Gaxha.

2016–present 

Following his success, Berisha continued his production career producing and writing songs for other Albanian artists. In 2016, Arilena Ara participated in the 18th edition of Kënga Magjike with the song "Nëntori" written by Berisha. The song finished in the third place and attained commercial success in Romania, Russia and Eastern Europe reaching number one in the Romanian Airplay Charts. Three years later, in 2019, he wrote another song for Arilena Ara titled "Shaj", which won the 58th edition of Festivali i Këngës. The artist will therefore represent Albania in the Eurovision Song Contest 2020 in Rotterdam, the Netherlands. In February 2020, "Flm Klm" was premiered and went on to reach number seventy eight in Albania.

Discography

Singles

As lead artist

As featured artist

References 

1990 births
Living people
Musicians from Skopje
Albanian musicians from North Macedonia
21st-century Albanian male singers
Albanian pop singers
Albanian songwriters